Long Crendon Football Club is a football club based in Long Crendon, Buckinghamshire, England.

History
Long Crendon were formed in 1886. The club won the first edition of the Oving Villages Cup in the 1889–90 season. In 2019, the club recorded a treble of the Berks & Bucks Intermediate Cup, the Oving Cup and the Hellenic League Division Two East. Long Crendon entered the FA Vase for the first time in 2019–20. In the following season Long Crendon entered the FA Cup.

At the end of the 2020–21 season the club were transferred to Division One of the Spartan South Midlands League.

Ground
In October 2018, Long Crendon announced a groundsharing agreement with Oxford City at Marsh Lane, having previously played at the Recreation Ground in Long Crendon.

Honours
Hellenic League
Division Two East champions 2018–19
Oving Villages Cup
Winners 1889–90, 1932–33, 1965–66, 1966–67, 1980–81, 1981–82, 1982–83, 1996–97, 1997–98, 2001–02, 2018–19

Records
Best FA Cup performance: Preliminary round, 2020–21
Best FA Vase performance: Second qualifying round, 2019–20
Record attendance: 1,904 vs Wycombe Wanderers, Berks & Bucks Senior Cup quarter-final, 15 February 2022 (at The ASM Stadium, Thame)

References

External links
Official website

Association football clubs established in 1886
1886 establishments in England
Football clubs in England
Football clubs in Buckinghamshire
Sport in Oxford
Hellenic Football League
Spartan South Midlands Football League